"Assault on Weapon Plus" is the title of a four-part storyline which ran through New X-Men #142 - #145 (September - December, 2003). It was written by Grant Morrison and pencilled by Chris Bachalo.

The storyline involved Wolverine, Cyclops and Fantomex taking on the mysterious and sinister Weapon Plus program.

Plot
 
In the course of their assault they learn that the Weapon Plus organization has been ultimately responsible for the original installment of the Weapon X Program as well as other government super-human programs such as Operation: Rebirth (the program which created the original Captain America, a.k.a. Weapon I).

The story starts by catching up with Cyclops, who has recently left the X-Men after his psychic affair with Emma Frost was exposed. Wolverine finds him drinking at the Hellfire Club, contemplating quitting the X-Men. Incidentally, Sabretooth is also dining at the facility. Wolverine is aggressive toward Sabertooth, but is unable to escalate an argument into a conflict because it is against the rules of the Hellfire Club for patrons to fight within the building. Fantomex arrives and convinces both Cyclops and Wolverine to join him in breaking into the Weapon Plus installation floating in orbit around the Earth.

On entering the complex, they find the station to be deserted. Fantomex explains in detail the agenda of the Weapon Plus program, detailing the list of candidates used for each of the Weapons. Wolverine uses the computer systems to access his personal file. He indicates that the files contain detailed information about his life before and during the Weapon Plus program. After setting a series of charges to detonate the station, Cyclops and Fantomex prepare to leave the facility. The station explodes with Wolverine inside, and the story ends with a cliffhanger regarding whether Wolverine survived the explosion.

Collected editions

The trade paperback New X-Men Vol.5: Assault on Weapon Plus reprinted the story (New X-Men #142-145) along with the previous  "Murder at the Mansion" storyline from New X-Men #139 -141 (July - August 2003).

As well as:

New X-Men Omnibus (collects New X-Men #114-154 and Annual 2001, 992 pages, December 2006 )
 New X-Men by Grant Morrison Ultimate Collection:
 Volume 2 (collects New X-Men #127-141, 360 pages, August 2008)
 Volume 3 (collects New X-Men #142-154, 336 pages, December 2008)

References